Mera Sasural is an Indian television drama series that aired on Sahara One channel in 2008. The story is of two young women, Heer and Goldie, in their in-laws' houses and brings alive the struggles of a woman in her attempt to strike a balance between the world that she is born into and the one that she enters the moment she is married.

Cast
 Darshan Dave
 Ragini Shah
 Urmila Kanetkar
 Sudhir Pandey
 Vishal Puri
 Nitika Anand
 Juhi Patel

External links
Mera Sasural's Official Site

Sahara One original programming
Indian television series
2008 Indian television series debuts
2008 Indian television series endings